Kerala People's Party was a political party in the Indian state of Kerala, led by actor S. Devan. It was formed on 2004. The party merged with BJP on 7 March 2021 and its leader S. Devan also joined BJP. S. Devan started his political career as a KSU worker while in his college, subsequently worked for Indian National Congress for some time during his college days.  Later he part his ways with the Indian National Congress Party and decided to work independently. Devan had also  contested in two Kerala Legislative Assembly elections as an independent candidate however lost both the election. 

S. Devan was expected to get a ticket to contest under the BJP, in 2021 Kerala legislative election which will be held on 6 April 2021. However, BJP chose other actors like Suresh Gopi, Krishnakumar and Vinu Mohan to contest from various seats and Devan was denied a ticket to contest. The new move from Devan and its party is yet to be announced.

References

Political parties in Kerala
Political parties established in 2004
2004 establishments in Kerala